Csönge is a village in Vas County, Hungary. The earliest known reference to the village was in 1429 under the name Chenge.

Famous people
Sándor Weöres was brought up in Csönge.

Matthew Csonge - The Emperor of Chunger

Daniel Nicholson & Michael Fagan Friends of Matthew Csonge

Populated places in Vas County